Scopula heba is a moth of the  family Geometridae. It is found on the Solomon Islands and Bougainville Island.

References

Moths described in 1920
heba
Moths of Oceania